Román Arrieta Villalobos, known as Manzanita (1924-2004), was a Catholic Archbishop in Costa Rica. He was born in San Antonio de Belén, Costa Rica, on November 13, 1924. He finished his secondary studies in Heredia before entering the Conciliar Seminary of San José, Costa Rica.

Ordained in the Metropolitan Cathedral of San José on December 18, 1948 by Mons. Víctor Manuel Sanabria Martínez and sent by him to Washington, D.C., to undertake his postgraduate studies. He was consecrated as first Bishop of Tilarán on September 21, 1961 at the Alajuela Cathedral. On July 10, 1979 he was appointed Archbishop of San José, a post he held until his resignation on July 13, 2002.

He took part in the Second Vatican Council where he was a member of the Commission on Canon Law.

He established the Minor Seminary of Tacares. He created a system of Social Security for the church employees, restored the Metropolitan Cathedral, and promoted the establishment of the Universidad Católica de Costa Rica

He died in the home where he was born on March 7, 2004.

External links 
 Arquidócesis de San José

1924 births
2004 deaths
Participants in the Second Vatican Council
People from Heredia Province
20th-century Roman Catholic bishops in Costa Rica
Roman Catholic bishops of Tilarán-Liberia
Roman Catholic archbishops of San José de Costa Rica